Blame the Hero is an American post-apocalyptic science fiction dark humor web miniseries created by Brandon Rogers. The series, which stars Rogers' as multiple main characters, centers around street thug Blame, who is sent back in time to prevent a nuclear apocalypse. The show premiered on March 2, 2019, on YouTube, and concluded on July 1, 2019, consisting of 7 episodes. At the 9th Streamy Awards, Blame the Hero received four nominations, winning Best Actor (for Rogers) and Best Scripted Series.

Premise
In 2033, street thug Sebastian "Blame" Hernandez arrives in an alternate reality where the United Kingdom has managed to conquer the world and declare world peace. Soon after, terrorist Bobby Worst nukes the planet and causes a global apocalypse. Blame is told by the Eldest Elmer that Blame himself caused the apocalypse through an unrelated chain of events that began in 1865. The eldest Elmer informs Blame that his actions have led to this moment, and that he must go back in time to ensure the events never happen.

He begins begins by going back a few years to when he was a child. As a child, he wanted a tattoo, and ended up getting a gang sign. However, this lead to women rejecting him, and, while "back in time", he allowed Sam, whom, unbeknownst to Blame, is his future foster father. Sam is a flamboyant and colorful person, and, a Christian, decides on a tattoo reading, "I Love Jesus" with a heart. 

After this, Blame travels back to 2033. However, the apocalypse has just started once again, meaning his journey was in vain. He heads back to the eldest Elmer in a bunker. There, he is betrayed by Elmer after revealing the whole plot was only to stop Worst from nuking the planet so Elmer could use a chemical weapon to turn everyone on Earth into Elmers. After killing the eldest Elmer for betraying him, he goes to find the time machine, and in the process kills multiple Elmers. He opens the time machine and prompts it to go back to when it was created. However, an Elmer got a hold of it and ended up being the one taken back in time with Blame.

Both are transported to Germany in 1943. Blame meets a crew of American assassins attempting to kill Hitler. Elmer finds the place where Hitler and two "associates" are, and is greeted with much joy from Hitler. These associates are, unknowing to Hitler, 2 of the assassins. Elmer warns Hitler that Blame has come to kill him before his birthday party, leading to stricter security.  Blame and an assassin get into a confrontation, with the assassin proposing Blame could want to kill Hitler just to be the only person with time travel. However, Blame denies this and invites the assassin to smoke marijuana with him.

The assassins plan the raid on his birthday party; the 2 assassins who befrieded Hitler will be inside and will give a signal for Blame and another assassin  to kill the 2 guards. They kill both guards and enter. An assasin takes the waiters clothes, and they poison the cake. The assasin brings the cake to Hitler, however Hitler recognizes they are not the same person. The assasin denies this and tries to leave, but Elmer smells marijuana coming from the assasin, and shoots him. Punchler, an assassin who befriended Hitler, reveals he was a spy for an unknown reason. He is shot and dies, and Kickler, the other friend of Hitler, attempts to shoot Hitler, but shoots and kills his mother and father. 

Elmer searches the kitchen for Blame, finding him behind a table. Blame throws a can next to Elmer to distract him, and then throws another directly at him. Outside, Kickler, has Hitler at gunpoint, and his wife and dog show up with guns. She shoots both, but is overpowered by Hitler, who takes off her wig to reveal she is not blonde before killing her. In the kitchen, Blame is overpowered and on the ground, and Hitler attepts to shoot him, but has no bullets left. Because Blame is overpowered, he summons Abraham Lincoln from the time machine, right before he cured cancer. Because he summoned him, the time machine was on the ground, and a fight between Elmer and Blame ensues. Lincoln and Hitler join in the fight on the sides of Blame and Elmer, respectively. The time machine is hit against a wall in the scuffle and malfunctions, sending Hitler and Lincoln to when Tankthrust proposed to Worst. They intervene just at the point where Worst vomits on Tankthrust's heart, leading to the apocalypse. Worst takes Tankthrust's kife and stabs Hitler, believing it would make his dad proud. However, his dad is unenthusiastic and leaves to chane identities, ashamed of his son. This leads Tankthrust to not need a heart, where she says she learned she didn't from Hitler's, "How to Rule A Nation of Stupid People." 

Lincoln returns to the fight with the time machine and is stabbed by Elmer, who was attempting to stab Blame. Blame stabs Elmer in the stomach, and Elmer goes down. Blame kneels next to him, and Elmer asks if Blame is afraid of death, to which he says, "When I die, I'm going to hell for life." Elmer replies by shooting him in the head, assumedly killing him. Elmer declares victory, and picks up the time machine to go back to the present. However, right before finishing his sentence, he vomits blood, and realizes the knife Blame stabbed him with was poisoned. Lincoln, believed to have been poisoned as well, realizes the knife was not poisoned.

In a hospital room, 2 assassins stand next to him, revealing in dialogue he is still alive, but likely would have a very altered memory if left alive. One assassin asks the other her name, since the war is over. The one who asked reveals her name is "Skinny Bitch", and the other assassin reveals herself as "Donna Phitz", Blame's future foster mother and husband. She is told to euthanize Blame, and she assumedly follows through on it.

Later, Donna and Skinny are seen in a field, with Skinny giving a eulogy for Blame. On television, it is annunced Tankthrust has won the U.S. Presidential Election, and the British couple who made America a British nation are seen watching the television, asking what the nation would be like if they ran it, showing that Blame saved America from becoming British. Later, an Elmer is seen in a tattoo parlor, sensing someone is supposed to be there (Blame), but no one appears and he continues to tattoo young Blame. Tankthrust appears with Worst, revealing they worked together to get Tankthrust elected. Later, an old man is seen with an elderly Donna, and, at the last few moments of the episode, is seen covering his gang tattoo with his sleeve, showing that he never changed his tattoo, and that he is still alive, meaning the timeline is forever fixed.

Cast

Main
Brandon Rogers as Sebastian "Blame" Hernandez / Bobby Worst / Lord Mingeworthy / Eldest Elmer / Bryce Tankthrust / Various

Recurring
Paulette Jones as Donna Phitts / Abraham Lincoln / Various
Alariza Nevarez portrays a young Donna Phitts
David July (credited as David Burton) as Swallow / Various
Dominiq Badiyo as Suck
Logan Bubar as Blame's Friend / Various
Kornbread Jeté as Queen's Advisor / Various
Georgina Leahy as Lady Mingeworthy / Various
Pulp Fictionally as Blame's Tatted Girlfriend (1)
Adam Neylan as Adolf Hitler / Various
Jude B. Lanston as News Correspondent / Various
Monique Parent as News Correspondent / Various
Joe Vulpis as Police Officer / Various
Nandini Minocha as News Correspondent / Various
Jonathan Hinman as News Correspondent / Various
Annelise Jr as TV Host / Various
Alex Diehl as Evil PE Kid / Various
Serena Laney as Evil PE Kid
Su Jan Chase as Evil PE Kid
Eric Morris as Auction Party Guest / Various
Morgan Roger as Distressed Influencer / Various

Guest
Jinkx Monsoon as the Queen
Vincent Marcus as Blame's Friend
Michael Henry as Queen's Advisor
Jack Plotnick as Coach Best / Little Blitzbin
Anthony Padilla as John Wilkes Booth / Duke Tugger
Jennifer Schemke as Madam Whip and Nae Nae / Various

Episodes

Production
On January 3, 2019, series creator Brandon Rogers announced that he had been working on a seven-part series set around the end of the world. Writing took place from early 2019 to mid-May of the same year. Rogers announced via Twitter that he had started filming for the series in January 2019. Said filming took place in Los Angeles, California, with the main portion of the series being filmed in Hollywood. On January 27, 2019, Rogers posted a teaser trailer for the series on his YouTube channel, declaring that the series would come out later that year. On February 13, 2019, Rogers posted a picture on his Instagram stating that the release date for the first episode was expected to be in March. On February 25, 2019, Rogers confirmed the statement, stating that the first episode would premiere on March 2, 2019.

Accolades

References

External links
 Series playlist on YouTube
 

2019 American television series debuts
Television series about cloning
Television series about multiple time paths
Television series about Nazis
Television series about parallel universes
American time travel television series
Fiction set in the 2030s
Fiction about time travel
Fiction about nuclear war and weapons
Fiction about consciousness transfer
Cultural depictions of Adolf Hitler
Cultural depictions of Abraham Lincoln
Cultural depictions of John Wilkes Booth
Television shows filmed in Los Angeles
Streamy Award-winning channels, series or shows
Television shows filmed in California
2010s American time travel television series